The Los Angeles County Department of Medical Examiner-Coroner (formerly the Department of Coroner) was created in its present form in Boyle Heights on December 17, 1920 by an ordinance approved by the Los Angeles County Board of Supervisors, although it has existed in some form since the late 19th century. On September 3, 2020, the Los Angeles County Board of Supervisors approved the name change for the department, from the Department of the Coroner to the Department of Medical Examiner-Coroner.

On July 9, 2010, the Board of Supervisors approved the appointment of Mark A. Fajardo, the Chief Forensic Pathologist at Riverside County, as the new Medical Examiner-Coroner, at an annual salary of $275,000. He formally replaced Lakshmanan Sathyavagiswaran, who served 2 years as the Coroner, in August 2013.

Dr. Mark Fajardo resigned in March 2016. A news report indicated that "he left because it became common to have up to 50 bodies waiting to be processed and the backlog of bodies was 'nuts'. ... and toxicology tests were taking six months to complete" due to inadequate staffing.

Lakshmanan Sathyavagiswaran was re-appointed, but as interim coroner, on April 11, 2016. As of December 30, 2016, the position of Chief Medical Examiner-Coroner had not been permanently filled. A search process had been initiated by the county, with Ralph Andersen & Associates working  "to develop a customized recruitment brochure for this position".

Dr. Jonathan R. Lucas was appointed as the Chief Medical Examiner-Coroner on July 10, 2017. Dr. Lucas announced his intent to leave DMEC (The Department of Medical Examiner-Coroner) in September of 2022. On November 4, 2022, Dr. Odey C. Ukpo, Medical Director of the Department, was sworn in as Interim Chief Medical Examiner-Coroner. Dr. Ukpo is the first African American to serve as Chief Medical Examiner-Coroner since the office was established in 1850. Dr. Ukpo joined the department in 2014 and served as a Senior Deputy Medical Examiner before being named Medical Director in June 2022.

List of coroners
Horace G. Cates: 1892-1896
Theodore Curphey: March 19, 1957 – October 25, 1967
Thomas Noguchi: October 26, 1967 – April 27, 1982
Ronald Kornblum: April 27, 1982 – July 1, 1990
J. Lawrence Cogan (Acting): July 2, 1990 – February 18, 1992
Lakshmanan Sathyavagiswaran: February 18, 1992 – March 31, 2013
Mark A. Fajardo: August 12, 2013 – April 11, 2016
Lakshmanan Sathyavagiswaran (interim): April 11, 2016 – January 18, 2017
Christopher Rogers (Acting): January 19, 2017 – July 9, 2017
Jonathan R. Lucas: July 10, 2017 – November 4, 2022
Odey C. Ukpo (interim): November 4, 2022 – present

See also

References

External links

Boyle Heights, Los Angeles
County government agencies in California
Government of Los Angeles County, California
Medical examiners